is a former Japanese football player.

Club statistics

References

External links

1987 births
Living people
Kanagawa University alumni
Association football people from Kanagawa Prefecture
Japanese footballers
J2 League players
J3 League players
Japan Football League players
Mito HollyHock players
Oita Trinita players
Matsumoto Yamaga FC players
YSCC Yokohama players
Association football defenders
Universiade bronze medalists for Japan
Universiade medalists in football
Medalists at the 2009 Summer Universiade